(They will put you under banishment), is a church cantata by Johann Sebastian Bach. He composed it in Leipzig for Exaudi, the Sunday after Ascension, and first performed it on 21 May 1724.

History and words 
Bach wrote the cantata in his first year in Leipzig for the Sunday Exaudi, the Sunday after Ascension. The prescribed readings for the Sunday were from the First Epistle of Peter, "serve each other", and from the second Farewell discourse in the Gospel of John, the promise of the Paraclete, the "Spirit of Truth", and the announcement of persecution. The unknown poet begins with a quotation from the Gospel. One year later, poet Christiana Mariana von Ziegler would begin her cantata text for the same occasion, with the same quotation, but other than that, the two works have little in common. The poet reflects the persecution of the Christians, confirmed by a chorale as movement 4, the first stanza of Martin Moller's "". In movement 5 the poet gives a reason, the Antichrist even thinking to work for God by fighting the Christians and their teaching. In movement 6, the suffering ones are promised God's help. The closing chorale is the final stanza of Paul Fleming's "".

Bach first performed the cantata on 21 May 1724. It is the last original cantata composition of his first annual cycle, followed by reworkings of older music until the beginning of the second annual cycle of chorale cantatas on the first Sunday after Trinity.

Scoring and structure 
The cantata in seven movements is scored for four vocal soloists (soprano, alto, tenor and bass), a four-part choir, two oboes, bassoon, two violins, viola and basso continuo:

Music 
As with many works of Georg Philipp Telemann, but rare in Bach's cantatas, the Bible quotation is split in two movements, a duet and a chorus which follows immediately in a different time and faster tempo. The duet is an expressive lamento, introduced by the two oboes in imitation on themes which the voices pick up. The chorus has been described as "tumultuous and excited" and likened to the rendering of the excited crowd (turba) in Bach's St John Passion and St Matthew Passion. It follows the text in mostly homophonic sections with independent instruments. The beginning, "" (But the time will come), is rendered in block chords as "repeated rhetorical calls". In the following "" (when whoever kills you), the word "" is "twice emphasized by a sudden, mysterious piano and wan, chromatically tinged harmonies", according to Klaus Hofmann, or "menacing chromatic texture of sustained notes underpinned by unexpected harmonies", according to Julian Mincham. Finally "" (will think that he does God a service by it) is interpreted by free imitation. After this sequential presentation of the three ideas of the text, they are repeated in variation and combination. Mincham summarises the "uncompromising" tone of the statement "the time will come when your murderer will believe that he has done a service to God".

Movement 3 refers to the opening in tranquil 3/4 time with an obbligato oboe. The words "" (martyrdom, exile, and bitter pain) are coloured in expressive chromatic, although the text speaks of overcoming them. Hofmann describes "sigh-like suspension and emotionally charged harmonic darkening". The commenting chorale, on the almost unadorned melody of "", is sung by the tenor on an ostinato in the continuo derived from the first line of the chorale. Hofmann observes in the continuo ostinato that "at the place where the song text has the word "Herzeleid" (heart ache), it is expanded by means of chromatic notes in between – a figurative expression of sorrow, of the lamentation that characterizes the whole movement". Mincham notes that this central chorale "seems almost to pre-empt the atonal harmonies of the twentieth century". The following short secco recitative marks a turning point, resulting in an aria of consolation in dance-like movement, accompanied by the strings doubled by the oboes. In the middle section, storms and "winds of trouble" give way to "the sun of joy soon smiled" (die Freudensonne bald gelacht), expressed in vivid coloraturas. The cantata closes with a four-part chorale setting on the melody of "O Welt, ich muß dich lassen", which resembles the setting of the same melody in movement 10 of the St Matthew Passion, "".

Recordings 
 Bach Cantatas Vol. 3 – Ascension Day, Whitsun, Trinity, Karl Richter, Münchener Bach-Chor, Münchener Bach-Orchester, Ernst Haefliger, Edith Mathis, Anna Reynolds, Dietrich Fischer-Dieskau, Archiv Produktion 1975
 J. S. Bach: Das Kantatenwerk – Sacred Cantatas Vol. 3, Nikolaus Harnoncourt, Wiener Sängerknaben, Chorus Viennensis, Concentus Musicus Wien, soloist of the Wiener Sängerknaben,  Paul Esswood, Kurt Equiluz, Ruud van der Meer, Teldec 1975
 East German Revolution, Hans-Joachim Rotzsch, Thomanerchor, Gewandhausorchester, Regina Werner, Gerda Schriever, Peter Menzel, Hermann Christian Polster, Pilz mid-1970s?
 Die Bach Kantate Vol. 35, Helmuth Rilling, Gächinger Kantorei, Bach-Collegium Stuttgart, Arleen Augér, Helen Watts, Aldo Baldin, Wolfgang Schöne, Hänssler 1979
 J. S. Bach: Himmelfahrts-Oratorium, Philippe Herreweghe, Collegium Vocale Gent, Barbara Schlick, Catherine Patriasz, Christoph Prégardien, Peter Kooy, Harmonia Mundi France 1993
 J. S. Bach: Complete Cantatas Vol. 10, Ton Koopman, Amsterdam Baroque Orchestra & Choir, Caroline Stam, Michael Chance, Paul Agnew, Klaus Mertens, Antoine Marchand 1998
 Bach Edition Vol. 5 – Cantatas Vol. 2, Pieter Jan Leusink, Holland Boys Choir, Netherlands Bach Collegium, Ruth Holton, Sytse Buwalda, Knut Schoch, Bas Ramselaar, Brilliant Classics 1999
 J. S. Bach: Cantatas Vol. 20 – Cantatas from Leipzig 1724 – BWV 44, 59, 173, 184, Masaaki Suzuki, Bach Collegium Japan, Yukari Nonoshita, Mutsumi Hatano, Gerd Türk, Peter Kooy, BIS 2001
 J. S. Bach: Cantatas for the Complete Liturgical Year Vol. 10: "Himmelfahrts-Oratorium " - Cantatas BWV 108 · 86 · 11 · 44, Sigiswald Kuijken, La Petite Bande, Siri Thornhill, Petra Noskaiová, Christoph Genz, Jan van der Crabben, Accent 2008

Notes

References

Sources 
 
 Sie werden euch in den Bann tun BWV 44; BC A 78 / Sacred cantata (7th Sunday of Easter) Bach Digital
 Cantata BWV 44 Sie werden euch in den Bann tun history, scoring, sources for text and music, translations to various languages, discography, discussion, Bach Cantatas Website
 BWV 44 Sie werden euch in den Bann tun English translation, University of Vermont
 BWV 44 Sie werden euch in den Bann tun text, scoring, University of Alberta
 
 Luke Dahn: BWV 44.7 bach-chorales.com

External links 
 Sie werden euch in den Bann tun, BWV 44: performance by the Netherlands Bach Society (video and background information)

Church cantatas by Johann Sebastian Bach
1724 compositions